Gracey is an unincorporated community in Washington County, in the U.S. state of Ohio.

History
A post office called Gracey was established in 1882, and remained in operation until 1916. George W. Gracey was the town's merchant.

References

Unincorporated communities in Washington County, Ohio
Unincorporated communities in Ohio